Major Nazmul Huq (11 August 1938 — 27 September 1971)  was the first sector commander of the 7th sector in the Bangladesh Liberation War. He is also called "The Lost Sector Commander" of Bangladesh Liberation War.

Life 
Huq was born in Amirabad village under Lohagara Upazila in Chittagong District to Advocate Hafej Ahmed and Joynab Begum. He passed his matriculation from Peshowara school of Comilla and H.S.C from Jagannath College, Dhaka. He joined the Pakistan army when he was a second-year student of Ahsanullah Engineering University (BUET). He was commissioned in artillery core on October 14, 1962.

Bangladesh Liberation War 

Huq was a very good organizer. In his sector, he directed the guerrilla warfare as well as trained the independence militia who lacked formal training on military operations. His coverage area was Rajshahi, Pabna, Bogra and part of Dinajpur district. Tarangapur was his headquarters. About fifteen thousand freedom fighters fought in this sector. Bir Shrestho Captain Mohiuddin Jahangir fought under his command.

Death 
Huq died in a road accident on 27 September 1971 when he was returning from Shiliguri cantonment. He was buried near Shona Masjid premises.

References 

1971 deaths
1938 births
Bangladeshi military personnel
Pakistani defectors
People from Lohagara Upazila
Road incident deaths in Bangladesh